Hunt v T&N plc, [1993] 4 S.C.R. 289 is a landmark decision of the Supreme Court of Canada on conflict of laws. The Court ruled that the Quebec law prohibiting the removal of company documents from the province was constitutionally inapplicable to a British Columbia court order. The decision was significant in that it affirmed much of the reasoning from Morguard Investments Ltd. v. De Savoye (1990) and further held that the principles first identified in Morguard are fundamental to the constitution.

Background

George Hunt, a resident of British Columbia, was diagnosed with cancer caused by the inhalation of asbestos fibres from a product that was manufactured in Quebec. As part of his action in British Columbia he tried to get an order to retrieve documents from the manufacturer in Quebec. The Quebec Business Concerns Records Act prohibited the removal of documents outside of the province. Hunt attempted to challenge the law as unconstitutional.

Hunt attempted to argue that Morguard - which allowed for inter-provincial enforcement of orders - could equally apply for constitutional challenges.

This was the second appearance before the Supreme Court of Canada for this case. The Court had previously ruled on the question of where a statement of claim could be struck out for want of a reasonable claim, stating that striking out cannot be justified because a pleading reveals "an arguable, difficult or important point of law".  On the contrary, it may well be critical that the action be allowed to proceed.

Reasons of the court

The Court allowed Hunt's appeal, in a unanimous decision written by La Forest J. He held that:

 the Quebec prohibition on the removal of documents for litigation in BC was constitutionally inapplicable. The Act would remain in force but could not be applied against other provinces.
 courts may consider constitutional arguments in determining foreign law that incidentally arises in the course of litigation.  A foreign court in making a finding of fact should not be bound to assume that the mere enactment of a statute necessarily means that it is constitutional.
 that both jurisdictions in question are part of the same Canadian federation and governed by the same Constitution reinforces and possibly augments the powers of the superior courts to consider the constitutional issues.
 the Supreme Court of Canada is not restricted to the identical powers and procedures of the lower courts from which an appeal is made.

Provincial courts in the Canadian federation

The nature of the inherent jurisdiction of the provincial superior courts was greatly expanded in Hunt, as noted in the judgment:

The extension of Morguard

Hunt has attained great significance because of the manner in which it built upon the principles first expressed in Morguard. As noted by Laforest J:

See also
 List of Supreme Court of Canada cases (Lamer Court)

References

External links
 

Canadian constitutional case law
Conflict of laws case law
Canadian civil procedure case law
Supreme Court of Canada cases
1993 in Canadian case law